Viperești is a commune in Buzău County, Muntenia, Romania. It is composed of six villages: Muscel, Pălici, Rușavăț, Tronari, Ursoaia and Viperești.

Notes

Communes in Buzău County
Localities in Muntenia